Elorhynchus is an extinct genus of hyperodapedontid rhynchosaur from the Mid-Late Triassic Chañares Formation of Argentina. The type species is Elorhynchus carrolli.

References 

Rhynchosaurs
Prehistoric reptile genera
Fossil taxa described in 2021
Triassic Argentina